Pathé Ismaël Ciss (born 16 March 1994) is a Senegalese professional footballer who plays as a central midfielder for Spanish club Rayo Vallecano.

Career
Ciss was born in Dakar, and joined the Diambars FC academy at the age of 12, joining his older brother Saliou and father Ibou, who was a coach there. He started his senior career at Diambars, before joining LigaPro side C.F. União on 31 July 2017.

Ciss made his professional debut on 13 August 2017, coming on as a late substitute for Gonçalo Abreu in a 2–0 home win against Real S.C. He scored his first goal abroad on 29 October, netting the game's only in a home defeat of U.D. Oliveirense.

On 30 August 2018, after União suffered relegation, Ciss moved to F.C. Famalicão on a one-year loan deal, still in the second division. He contributed with four goals during the campaign, as his side returned to Primeira Liga after 25 years.

On 2 September 2019, Ciss was loaned to Spanish Segunda División side CF Fuenlabrada, for one year. The following 13 July, he signed a permanent contract until 2023 with the club.

On 28 July 2021, Ciss signed a four-year deal with Rayo Vallecano, newly promoted to La Liga, along with teammate Randy Nteka.

Career statistics

Club

References

External links
 
 
 

1994 births
Living people
Footballers from Dakar
Senegalese footballers
Association football midfielders
Diambars FC players
Liga Portugal 2 players
C.F. União players
F.C. Famalicão players
La Liga players
Segunda División players
CF Fuenlabrada footballers
Rayo Vallecano players
2022 FIFA World Cup players
Senegalese expatriate footballers
Senegalese expatriate sportspeople in Portugal
Senegalese expatriate sportspeople in Spain
Expatriate footballers in Portugal
Expatriate footballers in Spain